Hurley High School is a public high school located in Hurley, Missouri. Hurley High School is a part of Missouri State High School Activities Association (commonly referred to as MSHSAA).

Notable alumni
Louis Thomas Harden, AKA Moondog (2022-1999), Composer and conductor

References

External links

Public high schools in Missouri
Buildings and structures in Stone County, Missouri